Tiago dos Santos Alves (born 29 May 1984), known as Tiago Alves, is a Brazilian professional footballer who plays as a central defender.

Honours
Icasa
Campeonato Cearense 2ª Divisão: 2010

ASA
Campeonato Alagoano: 2011

Palmeiras
Campeonato Brasileiro Série B: 2013

External links

1984 births
Living people
Footballers from Belo Horizonte
Brazilian footballers
Association football defenders
Campeonato Brasileiro Série A players
Campeonato Brasileiro Série B players
Associação Desportiva Recreativa e Cultural Icasa players
Fortaleza Esporte Clube players
Mogi Mirim Esporte Clube players
Agremiação Sportiva Arapiraquense players
Associação Atlética Ponte Preta players
Sociedade Esportiva Palmeiras players
Clube Náutico Capibaribe players
Red Bull Brasil players
Ceará Sporting Club players
Mirassol Futebol Clube players